Kasonga Jonathan Ngandu (born 25 October 2001) is an English professional footballer who plays for Scottish club Hamilton Academical as a midfielder.

Career
Ngandu started his career in the youth system at Coventry City, where he signed his first professional contract in October 2018. A month later he made his debut in an EFL Trophy game against Cheltenham Town.

On 2 September 2020, Ngandu joined Icelandic 1. deild karla side Keflavík on loan.

He was released by Coventry City at the end of the 2021–22 season. The following month, he appeared as a trialist in a friendly for Scottish Championship side Hamilton Academical. He signed for Hamilton Academical on 5 July 2022.

Career statistics

References

External links

English footballers
Coventry City F.C. players
Association football midfielders
Living people
2001 births
Footballers from Greater London
Black British sportspeople
English expatriate footballers
Expatriate footballers in Iceland
English expatriate sportspeople in Iceland
Knattspyrnudeild Keflavík players
Hamilton Academical F.C. players